Velikkakathu Sankaran Achuthanandan (born 20 October 1923) is an Indian Communist politician who was the Chief Minister of Kerala from 2006 to 2011. At 82, he is the oldest person to have assumed the office. He served as the chairman of Administrative reforms in Kerala with state cabinet rank from 2016 to 2021. He was also a former 3 times Leader of the Opposition of Kerala state.

Achuthanandan was a member of the CPI(M) Politburo from 1985 until July 2009, when he was reverted to the Central Committee of the party owing to his ideological dispositions.

Achuthanandan initiated various actions as the Chief Minister, including the demolition drive in Munnar which claimed back acres of illegally occupied land, the demolition drive in Kochi M. G. Road which claimed back the long lost shoulder of the road, anti-piracy drive against film-piracy, his struggle against the Lottery mafia in the state. He was instrumental in convicting former minister R. Balakrishna Pillai on charges of corruption. Achuthanandan also took the lead in promoting free software in the state, and especially in adopting free software in the public education system of the state.

Early life 
Born on 20 October 1923 to Sankaran and Accamma in Punnapra, Alappuzha, Travancore (part of present-day Kerala state, India), he lost his mother when he was four years old and subsequently lost his father aged 11. This forced him to quit his studies after finishing 7th standard in school and college. He started working by helping his elder brother in a village tailoring shop. Later he took up the job of meshing coir to make ropes at a coir factory.

Achuthanandan was in the forefront of the land struggles in Kerala starting with the Alappuzha declaration in 1970 demanding implementation of the Land Reforms Act passed by the EMS Government in 1967. Later his activities as the leader of the Opposition in the Kerala Assembly had evoked good public response.

Political life 
He entered politics through trade union activities and joined State Congress in 1938. In 1940, he became a member of the Communist Party of India (CPI). During his 40 years as a politician he was imprisoned for five years and six months and was in hiding for four and half years. He was a state secretariat member of the CPI in 1957. He is the only living Keralite among the 32 members who left the CPI National Council in 1964 to form the Communist Party of India (Marxist) . He was the Secretary of the Kerala State Committee between 1980 and 1992. He was a member of the CPI(M) Polit Bureau since 1985 until he was removed as a party disciplinary action. He is the senior most leader of CPI(M) in India.

Chief Minister of Kerala (2006-2011) 

During the assembly elections held in Kerala in April–May 2006, VS Achuthanandan defeated Satheesan Pacheeni of the United Democratic Front by a margin of 20,017 votes in Malampuzha constituency in Palakkad district. He was sworn in as Chief Minister of Kerala on 18 May 2006, with his 21-member cabinet. Aged 82 years and 7 months at time, he was the oldest Chief Minister of Kerala, and one of the oldest in the whole of India. It is noticeable that he had been denied a party ticket to contest elections just two months before he was sworn in. He became the 11th Chief Minister of Kerala. On 12 July 2009, the CPI(M) Polit bureau and Central Committee removed him from the PB for his stands taken in relation to the accusation and legal procedures against Pinarayi Vijayan in his reported involvement in the Lavlin bribery.

2011 Assembly election 

The 2011 Kerala Legislative Assembly election, proved to be one of the closest in Kerala's history, with the UDF beating the LDF by a margin of 4 seats. After this election, Achuthanandan was considered the man behind the Uprising of LDF after the 2009 Parliament and 2010 Municipal election losses. The CPI(M) denied a seat to Achuthanandan for the 2011 assembly election. Protests took place across the state and even on social networking sites such as Twitter, Facebook and via SMS.
In what can be considered as a near repeat of the 2006 pre-election build-up, the Politbureau of CPI-M impressed upon the state leadership to permit VS Achuthanandan to contest elections for the April 2011 Assembly election in Kerala. VS Achuthanandan contested from the Malampuzha Constituency and won with a margin of around 25,000 votes.

Removal of personal staff

On 12 May 2013, three of his personal staff V.K. Sasidharan (additional private secretary), A. Suresh (personal assistant) and K. Balakrishnan (press secretary) were ousted by the Politburo, which was entrusted by the CPI(M) central committee to decide on the action to be taken against them. They were expelled on charges of leaking information to media, according to CPI(M). With the decision, Achuthanandan's arch-rival and Communist Party of India-Marxist (CPI(M)) state secretary Pinarayi Vijayan appears to have won. The state committee of the party where Vijayan has a huge majority also wanted Achuthanandan to be removed from the post of leader of opposition but this was not done. "This is a clipping of the wings of Achuthanandan", said K.M. Shahjahan.

2016 Assembly elections 

Achuthanandan was appointed Chairman of the Administrative Reforms Commission on 3 August 2016.

Major achievements 

In 2006, under the leadership of Achuthanandan government decided to develop and operate an International Container Transshipment Terminal (ICTT), Vallarpadam. Though it is a central government project, Achuthanandan government has taken strong steps to take over land required for road and rail lines for the project. The International Container Transshipment Terminal, Kochi was inaugurated on 11 February 2011, it is the first transshipment terminal in India and the first container terminal to operate in a SEZ.

The Technopark in Kollam was initiated, planned and constructed during Achuthanandan government. The plan for setting up the first district IT park in Kerala at Kollam was announced in January 2009. The Foundation stone was laid by Achuthanandan in February 2009. The park was set up expecting employment to the tune of 20,000 and investments of 800 crores. 
The first phase of park was inaugurated by Achuthanandan on February 15, 2011.

In 2009, Achuthanandan ministry started the work of Infopark Cherthala in Alappuzha. The project was inaugurated by 
Achuthanandan on 10 January 2011. With the state's IT sector witnessing a phenomenal growth, it has become necessary to expand Infopark, Kochi, to the satellite towns of the city. Infrastructure development at the IT parks at Infopark Cherthala, Infopark Ambalappuzha and InfoPark Thrissur, which are the satellite units of Infopark, Kochi, were progressing fast. Achuthanandan laid the foundation stone of the second phase of Infopark at Kakkanad. The project is developed on 160 acres.

In 2008, Achuthanandan government  proposed an International airport in Mattannur, Kannur. Two years later, Achuthanandan laid the foundation stone for the Kannur International Airport at the project site marking the formal commencement of construction activities on 17 December 2010 at a function attended by the then Civil Aviation Minister Praful Patel.

In 2008, Achuthanandan government approved the Kochi Metro rail project in a cabinet meeting held on 2 January 2008 and sent to Central Government for ratification.

 Initiated action against encroachment on government land in the hill resort and tea plantation town of Munnar.
 On 30 December 2007, he became the first Communist CM to trek to Sabarimala. The 84-year-old Achuthanandan rejected any sort of physical or medical support which worried his doctors.
 V S Achuthanandan supports free and open source software movement in the state and Richard Stallman has also supported his activities regarding this.

 Major developments in Trivandrum Technopark including second and third phases of Technopark and technocity
 IT park in Kozhikkode- Cyberpark
 Major IT export growth during his tenure surpassing national average.
 Major renovation of Malampuzha Tourist destination
 AshtaMudi tourism circuit in Kollam
 Closing down of illegal lottery mafia from state
 Major initiation against resort mafia including ordinance to take over Kovalam palace
 Chamravattom regulator cum bridge a major project of Malappuram and completed during his tenure as CM
VS filed and won the case against Manorama for illegally occupying 400 acres of land of Panthaloor temple.

The drive to reclaim paddy land 
The anti-reclamation stir launched by the Kerala State Karshaka Thozhilali Union (KSKTU) at Mankompu in 1996–97, under the leadership of Achuthanandan created much controversy. This stir was claimed to be highlighting the serious problem of the massive conversion of paddy fields into another type of land, affecting the food security of the Kerala. But this soon developed into a crop destruction drive. The protest got the sobriquet following the violent methods and crop destruction resorted to by the KSKTU cadre. The stir attracted lot of public attention and Achuthanandan was forced to express his disapproval of any destruction of crops. 15 years later, in November 2011, a UDF Minister, who is politically opposed to Achuthanandan, justified this struggle. Janata Dal Socialist leader and minister for Agriculture, K.P. Mohananan said such a struggle was necessary as conversion of paddy fields to another type of crops is a serious concern.

In popular culture 
 Thilakan portrayed the role of chief minister, which was closely modeled on V. S. Achuthanandan, in the film Aayudham (2008)
 In the film I. G. – Inspector General, Rajan P. Dev portrayed the role of the CM which was closely modeled on V. S. Achuthanandan. 
 In the Malayalam film August 15, the character of Chief Minister of Kerala, played by actor Nedumudi Venu was inspired by the political life of V. S. Achuthanandan.

Awards 
 Pravasi Express Awards Lifetime Achievement Award 2013
 Ali Hassan Memorial Samskarika Samithi Award
 Velu Thampi Memorial National Award
 S Sivasankara Pillai memorial Award
 News Maker of the year Award
 Janasevana Praveen Award
 P Palpu Foundation Award
PS John Endowment Award
NC Sekhar Award

Books 

 Samaram Thanne Jeevitham (സമരം തന്നെ ജീവിതം)
Kerala Vikasana Sankalpangal
 Samarathinu Idavelakalilla
 Idapedalukalkku Avasanamilla
Ayankali Muthal Pashimagatam vare (അയ്യങ്കാളി മുതല്‍ പശ്ചിമഘട്ടംവരെ)
Janapaksham (ജനപക്ഷം)
Paristhithiyum Vikasanavum (പരിസ്ഥിതിയും വികസനവും)
Irakal Vettayadappedumbol

See also 
 List of chief ministers of Kerala

References

Further reading

External links

 The official website of the Chief Minister of Kerala
  Financial Express news, Kerala takes the fizz out of Coke & Pepsi
 comradevs.com, A webpage designed for V S Achuthanandan
 An interview with VS Tehelka
 Has the son put the father In the dock? From Tehelka Magazine, Vol 8, Issue 11, Dated 19 Mar 2011
 official facebook page
 twitter

1923 births
Living people
Chief Ministers of Kerala
Communist Party of India (Marxist) politicians from Kerala
Indian atheists
Malayali politicians
Kerala politicians
Indian independence activists from Kerala
Trade unionists from Kerala
Leaders of the Opposition in Kerala
Chief ministers from Communist Party of India (Marxist)
People from Alappuzha district
Kerala MLAs 1967–1970
Kerala MLAs 1970–1977
Kerala MLAs 1991–1996
Kerala MLAs 2001–2006
Kerala MLAs 2006–2011
Kerala MLAs 2011–2016